Alyaksey Merkulaw (born 17 November 1972) is a Belarusian professional football coach and former player. He was a head coach for Gomel in 2013–2014 again in 2018–2019.

References

External links
 Profile at Gomel website
 

1972 births
Living people
Sportspeople from Gomel
FC Gomel players
Belarusian footballers
FC Slavia Mozyr players
FC Rechitsa-2014 players
Association football goalkeepers
Belarusian football managers
FC Gomel managers